Samaggi Samagom ("Unity Association"), the Thai Association in the United Kingdom, was established in 1901 by King Rama VI of Thailand. Samaggi Samagom is Thailand's only student association under royal patronage. It adheres to its original purpose as a locus for Thai students, roughly 10,000 in the UK, to connect with one another. The Thai Embassy in London and its Office of Educational Affairs (OEA) has a large presence in the association's activities, with embassy representatives, and sometimes the ambassadors themselves, attending Samaggi Samagom events. The close working relationship is reflected in a Samaggi office located inside the OEA, but mostly by embassy funding of Samaggi's academic events.

Samaggi events 
Samaggi Samagom organises many events for the Thai community in the UK, including Samaggi Karaoke Night, Samaggi Bowling Competition, and seminars. The major events organised by Samaggi Samagom are the Samaggi Games and Samaggi Night, a concert. The association’s recreational events, such as its annual concert and sports day, are funded by Thai companies.

Samaggi Games 
Samaggi Samagom's biggest event is the annual Samaggi Games. This is a sports day that involves several thousands of people, and is well attended by most Thai students as well as Thai expatriate workers in the UK. Many Thai companies use this opportunity to advertise their respective firms. The firms range from PTT to small Thai restaurants in the UK wishing to reach a broader market. Samaggi Games is open to all Thai students in the UK and hosts more than 1,000 Thai students from around the UK who come to play and support the games. Sports such as football, basketball, tennis, badminton, table tennis, squash, chair ball, and traditional Thai games such as Thai chess are contested.

Samaggi seminars 
Seminars held by Samaggi in 2007 included the "Happiness Index", a talk by researcher Khun Nattavudh Powdthavee on the measurement of happiness; a talk by Gordon Bennett from Amnesty International on the death penalty; and a seminar on the future of Thailand's 18th constitution, which was being drafted at the time, led by Peter Leyland, a professor of public law at SOAS, University of London, and London Metropolitan University.

Thai governmental oversight
In 2011, the Thai Embassy in London intervened to force the removal of an article from Samaggi Sara, the group's annual journal. The article was a five-page interview with Giles "Ji" Ungpakorn, a Thai academic wanted by Thai authorities for lèse majesté who now lives in exile in England. The society was threatened with losing all Thai governmental support if it did not comply. Several days before publication, the interview was removed.

Teeraporn Suwanvidhu, Samaggi President at the time, said, "I asked [the ambassador] whether he had...read the article, which I thought was balanced and not provocative at all. His reply was that it wasn't necessary, due to the...fact that Mr Giles' name is on the 'blacklist',...It's not even censorship. It's something more than that", she noted. 

Samaggi Samagom in 2016 faces even more hurdles from Thailand’s post-coup military government. Since the 2014 military coup no politically-related academic events have been held. "We try not to hold events that are too sensitive, otherwise it will definitely not be approved [by the embassy]", then Samaggi President Thanawat Silaporn said in early-2016. In 2011, when Samaggi was forced to censor the interview with Mr Giles, Samaggi secured the majority of its funds from the private sector. In 2012, Samaggi received 20 percent of its funding from the embassy. Samaggi currently refuses to disclose the public/private funding ratio, but said the embassy and OEA has provided about £2,000 (102,700 baht) for academic events.

The Bangkok Post sums it up as, "Thai university societies in the United Kingdom built their reputations on political debate, but are now cowering under close government scrutiny."

See also
 Thais in the United Kingdom

References

External links 
 Samaggi Samagom official website
 The future of Samaggi Samagom Pt.1 (video)
 The future of Samaggi Samagom Pt. 2 (video)

Thai societies in the United Kingdom
 Bath University Thai Association
 Cambridge University Thai Society (CUTS)
 Thai Society University of Essex
 Imperial College Thai Society
 Thai Students at Lancaster University
 University of Nottingham Thai Society
 Oxford Thai Society
 Sheffield Thai Society (STS)
 Thai Society in Southampton
 Southampton Thai Society : Activity Forum
 University of Warwick Thai Society
 Thai Student Society in Glasgow
 Thai Student Society Bradford College University Centre
 Thai Society of Manchester (TSM)
King's College London Thai Society
 University of Bristol Thai Society
 University of the Arts London (UAL)
 University College London (UCL) Thai Society
 University of Exeter Thai Society
 Thai Student Society of Leicester
 Loughborough University Thai Society
 University of Kent Thai Society
 SOAS, University of London Thai Society
Ethnic organisations based in the United Kingdom
Overseas Thai organizations
Thai diaspora in Europe